Hans Henning Ørberg (21 April 1920 – 17 February 2010) was a Danish linguist and teacher. He received a master's degree in English, French, and Latin at the University of Copenhagen and taught these languages in schools in Denmark.

Career 
While there he created a new course in Latin:  published in 1955. Besides the author's name, there are no non-Latin words in the book. In his retirement, Ørberg directed the  publishing house and gave lectures in Europe and the United States on the natural method.

Ørberg's  is based on the method of natural approach or contextual induction. Words are always introduced in a context that reveals the meaning behind them, or they are explained in the margins of the text with images, Latin synonyms or antonyms, or short Latin definitions. Grammar is gradually made more complex until the student is reading unadapted Latin texts. Unusual for a Latin course, pronunciation and understanding, rather than translation, are stressed. A dictionary is not necessary in this system; because the textbooks are composed entirely in Latin, they can be used by speakers of many languages. The student is assumed to know the Latin alphabet and be familiar with a Romance language or English. Using illustrations and modifications, these texts can be understood through context and by reference to words already learned.

Chapters consist of an illustrated and annotated reading followed by a concise and formal discussion of the grammar used in the chapter, as well as several , or exercises, that require the student to apply these grammatical concepts to selections from the chapter's reading. These exercises ask the student to manipulate the grammar of Latin sentences rather than to translate. Even the grammar discussions are entirely in Latin, grammatical terminology being introduced as necessary.

See also 

 Latin language
 Latin literature
 Linguistics

Notes

References

External links
 Lingua Latina (Official Page)
 

1920 births
2010 deaths
Danish academics
Language teachers
Danish Latinists
Danish philologists
University of Copenhagen alumni
20th-century Latin-language writers
Textbook writers